Holcosus pulcher is a species of lizard in the family Teiidae. The species is native to Costa Rica and Honduras.

References

pulcher
Reptiles of North America
Reptiles described in 1861